{{Infobox college basketball team|women=yes
|current= 2022–23 DePaul Blue Demons women's basketball team
|name = DePaul Blue Demons
|logo = 
|logo_size = 150
|university = DePaul University
|conference = Big East
|location = Chicago, Illinois
|coach = Doug Bruno
|tenure = 35th
|arena = Wintrust ArenaMcGrath–Phillips Arena
|capacity = 10,3873,000
|nickname = Blue Demons
|studentsection =
|NCAAtourneys = 1990, 1991, 1992, 1993, 1995, 1996, 1997, 2003, 2004, 2005, 2006, 2007, 2008, 2009, 2010, 2011, 2012, 2013, 2014, 2015, 2016, 2017, 2018, 2019, 2022
|NCAAchampion = 
|NCAArunnerup =
|NCAATitleGame =
|NCAARunner-up =
|NCAAfinalfour = 
|NCAAeliteeight =
|NCAAsweetsixteen = 2006, 2011, 2014, 2016
|NCAAsecondround = 1990, 1992, 1996, 2004, 2005, 2006, 2011, 2012, 2014, 2015, 2016, 2017, 2018
|conference_tournament = Conference USA 2005

Big East Conference2014, 2015, 2018, 2019, 2020|conference_season = North Star Conference1987, 1988, 1989

Great Midwest Conference1992

Conference USA1996, 2005

Big East Conference2014, 2015, 2016, 2017, 2018, 2020''
}}

The DePaul Blue Demons women's basketball program is the NCAA Division I intercollegiate women's basketball program of DePaul University in Chicago, Illinois. The team competes in the Big East Conference.

The Blue Demons play home games at Wintrust Arena at the McCormick Place convention center on Chicago's Near South Side and at McGrath–Phillips Arena on DePaul's Lincoln Park campus.

History
The DePaul women’s basketball team began competing in the IAIAW in 1974–1975 under coach Debbie Miller and had their first winning season two seasons later, obtaining an 11–10 record under current coach Doug Bruno.

DePaul is one of the seven core schools that left the original Big East Conference in 2013 to form the current Big East Conference.  Before joining the original Big East in 2005, the Blue Demons previously competed in Conference USA, the Great Midwest Conference, and the North Star Conference.

Year by year results
Source

|-style="background: #ffffdd;"
| colspan="8" align="center" | North Star Conference|-style="background: #ffffdd;"
| colspan="8" align="center" | Great Midwest Conference|-style="background: #ffffdd;"
| colspan="8" align="center" | Conference USA|-style="background: #ffffdd;"
| colspan="8" align="center" | Big East Conference (1979–2013)|-style="background: #ffffdd;"
| colspan="8" align="center" | Big East Conference'''

NCAA tournament results
The Blue Demons made their 20th appearance in the NCAA tournament in 2015. After the 2022 tournament, their combined record is 17–25.

Notable players and coaches

National awards
Tamika Catchings Award (USBWA Freshman of the Year)
Aneesah Morrow – 2022

WBCA Freshman of the Year
Aneesah Morrow – 2022

Carol Eckman Award
Doug Bruno – 2008

Conference awards
Big East Conference Player of the Year
Brittany Hrynko – 2015
Chanise Jenkins – 2016
Brooke Schulte – 2017

Big East Conference Freshman of the Year
Aneesah Morrow – 2022

 Big East Conference Defensive Player of the Year
Jacqui Grant – 2017
Chante Stonewall – 2020

 Big East Conference Sixth Player of the Year
China Threatt – 2009
Taylor Pikes – 2011
Tanita Allen – 2017

 Big East Conference Coach of the Year
Doug Bruno – 2014, 2016, 2017

 Conference USA Player of the Year
Kim Williams – 1996

 Conference USA Freshman of the Year
Khara Smith – 2003
Allie Quigley – 2005

 Conference USA Sixth Player of the Year
Kris Booker – 1996

 Conference USA Coach of the Year
Doug Bruno – 2005

 Conference USA All-Decade Team
Khara Smith

 Conference USA Coach of the Decade
Doug Bruno

 Great Midwest Conference Player of the Year
Tammy Williams – 1993
Latasha Byears – 1995

 Great Midwest Conference Coach of the Year
Doug Bruno – 1995

 North Star Conference Player of the Year
Sally Anderson – 1987
Diana Vines – 1988, 1989

 North Star Conference Coach of the Year
Jim Izard – 1987

References

External links